The Greater Metropolitan Area of Costa Rica, is the largest urban agglomeration in Costa Rica, comprising areas of high population density surrounding the capital, San José, which geographically corresponds to the Central Valley and extended to include the Guarco Valley, where some of the cantons of the Cartago province are located.

The proper definition and delimitation corresponds to the National Institute of Statistics and Census of Costa Rica (INEC) and could vary over time. According to the last census, the GAM has a population of 3.1 million inhabitants (about 60% of the population) in an area of 2,044 km² (just around 3.84% of the area Costa Rica ).

General definition
Since colonial times, Costa Rica's Central Valley houses a major share of the population in less than a tenth of the country's total area. On this plateau lies three of the seven provincial seats, including the capital, San José.  Throughout the years a strong immigration stream spurred by the uneven economic opportunities and a growing job demand helped to expand this urban cores and to develop new residential areas in former agricultural lands.

The Greater Metropolitan Area has an area of  composed of the Central Valley and Guarco Valley, partially covering the four provinces of San José, Alajuela, Cartago and Heredia, and the following cantons (some partially by including only some of their districts):

 San José province (13 cantons):
 San José
 Escazú
 Desamparados
 Aserrí
 Mora
  Goicoechea
 Santa Ana
 Alajuelita
 Vázquez de Coronado
 Tibás
 Moravia
 Montes de Oca
 Curridabat
Alajuela province (3 cantons):
Alajuela
Atenas
Poás
Cartago province (6 cantons):
Cartago
Paraíso
La Unión
Alvarado
Oreamuno
El Guarco
 Heredia province (9 cantons):
 Heredia
 Barva
 Santo Domingo
 Santa Bárbara
 San Rafael
 San Isidro
 Belén
 Flores 
 San Pablo

References

 
Metropolitan areas of Costa Rica
San José, Costa Rica
San José (canton)
Geography of San José Province